Campbell Polson Berry (November 7, 1834 – January 8, 1901) was a Democratic politician from California. He served in the California State Assembly from 1869 to 1873 and again from 1875 to 1880, representing Sutter County, and became Speaker of the Assembly in 1877–78. He later served in the U.S. House of Representatives, representing California's 3rd District for two terms from 1879 to 1883.

Life and career 
Born in Jackson County, Alabama; Berry moved with his parents to Berryville, Arkansas in 1841. He attended grammar school in Berryville, and moved to California in 1848, settling near Yuba City. Berry engaged in agricultural pursuits and worked in the mercantile business  before being elected to the California State Assembly in the 1868 election. For a year, Berry served as the Speaker of the California State Assembly for one year before his election the U.S. House of Representatives in 1878.

In 1882, Berry declined to be a candidate for renomination and was succeeded by Democrat Barclay Henley.

Death 
In 1901, Berry died. He is interred in Fairview Cemetery in Sutter County, California.

References

External links

1834 births
1901 deaths
Democratic Party members of the United States House of Representatives from California
Speakers of the California State Assembly
People from Sutter County, California
People from Jackson County, Alabama
19th-century American politicians